The Saturn Myth: A Reinterpretation of Rites and Symbols Illuminating Some of the Dark Corners of Primordial Society is a 1980 non-fiction book written by David N. Talbott which speculates that early humanity witnessed a much different celestial alignment. According to the book, Earth was a former satellite of Saturn before a hypothesized cataclysm, which caused the earth, Saturn, Mars, and Venus to lose their previous orbits.

Synopsis
The book examines similar tales in comparative mythology and states that thousands of years ago, Earth was a former satellite of Saturn, and that a vastly different solar system alignment existed. This proto-Saturn, devoid of its current rings, was much closer to the sun. 

According to the author, a major cataclysm disfigured the previous planetary configuration and unleashed major chaos on a formerly advanced human civilization.

This astronomical catastrophe ended a previous Golden Age in which humans, previously living in an advanced civilization, witnessed drastic changes in their sky. 

Survivors of this cataclysm later retold this story to their descendants in the form of religious archetypes, which represents planetary bodies.

The book's concept is widely promoted on a YouTube channel called The Thunderbolts Project and is organized by the theory's advocates. The basis for the book's claims rely on recurring tales in mythology regarding ancient archetypes and formulates a cosmological answer for the many similarities between these myths. The writer of the book promotes a fringe version of the cosmological model called the Plasma Universe Theory.

Many contemporary scientists regard the book as a form of pseudohistory. Much of the inspiration for the book comes from ideas postulated by psychoanalyst Immanuel Velikovsky.

1980 books
 Fiction set on Saturn